James Spencer Matthews (born 21 August 1975) is a British former professional racing driver, hedge fund manager, and heir to the Scottish feudal title of Laird of Glen Affric. In 2017, he married Pippa Middleton, the younger sister of Catherine, Princess of Wales and sister in law of William, Prince of Wales.

Early life and education
Matthews is the eldest son of David Matthews, whose father  Wallace Matthews worked in the coal industry and then a garage near Rotherham. David Matthews made a fortune as a car dealer before going into the luxury hotel business. James' father also owns the resort Eden Rock, St Barths and is also laird of a 10,000 acre Scottish estate, Glen Affric. James' mother is Zimbabwean born artist Jane Matthews ( Jane Spencer Parker), whose father was architect Robert Spencer 'Spenny' Parker. Jane Matthews was educated at London's Slade School of Art. James is the older brother of Spencer Matthews, an actor on the reality TV show Made in Chelsea.

The childhood of Matthews and his two brothers, Spencer and Michael, was split between Caunton Manor, the 18th-century manor house on his family's 30-acre estate in Nottinghamshire, and Eden Rock, St Barths, the family's luxury hotel on the French Caribbean island of Saint Barthélemy. Another privately owned home enjoyed by his family is the "castle-like" hunting lodge on their 10,000-acre Glen Affric Estate in Scotland. Matthews' brother, Michael, died in 1999 in a mountaineering accident on Mount Everest, hours after becoming the youngest Briton to conquer the peak. Matthews and his brother Michael both boarded at Uppingham School, in Rutland, whereas Spencer boarded at Eton. James, however, skipped higher education to train as a securities trader at Spear, Leeds & Kellogg, now part of Goldman Sachs. In 1997 James Matthews moved to a finance house called Nordic Options Ltd, which de-merged from Spear, where he became a senior equity options trader.

Career

Racing
As a racing driver he has competed in such series as the British Formula 3 Championship. He won a record number of 11 rounds on his way to the British Formula Renault Championship title in 1994 for Manor Motorsport. Dominating both home and abroad, he added to that by winning the Eurocup Formula Renault in the same year.

City career
Matthews became a City of London trader in 1995 and in 2001 was co-founder of Eden Rock Capital Management (named after his father's Eden Rock hotel), of which he is now Chief Executive. By 2007 the firm was reported to be managing over £1 billion in assets, and in 2017 David Friedman estimated that Matthews was "a demi-billionaire or close to a billionaire on his own merits".

It was reported in July 2016 that Matthews's Eden Rock Capital Management fund was a major investor in a collapsed Scottish company at the heart of a £90 million fraud investigation.

Glen Affric

According to documents lodged with Companies House, James Matthews has been, since 2007, the "solitary managing director of Beaufort Glen Affric Ltd". The  Glen Affric Estate is in the Scottish Highlands. As eldest son, upon his father's death, James Matthews will inherit the courtesy title of Laird of Glen Affric. Until that time he is able to use, should he choose to do so, the title, James Matthews of Glen Affric the younger.

Matthews' brother-in-law, James Middleton was reported in The Times in 2018 as hosting deer stalking parties at Glen Affric Estate. Although Matthews is the heir to the title Laird of Glen Affric, he describes James Middleton as being "a much better host than I am".

Personal life
In July 2016, it was reported that Matthews had become engaged to Pippa Middleton, sister to Catherine, Princess of Wales. Matthews and Middleton were married on 20 May 2017. As the husband to Middleton and brother-in-law to the Princess of Wales, he is the uncle of Prince George, Princess Charlotte and Prince Louis, second, third, and fourth in line to the British throne respectively.

Their son was born in October 2018 at St Mary's Hospital, London. Their elder daughter was born in March 2021. Their second daughter was born in June 2022.

References

External links
 Career statistics from Driver Database
 

1975 births
Living people
British racing drivers
Formula Renault Eurocup drivers
British Formula Renault 2.0 drivers
British Formula Three Championship drivers
24 Hours of Le Mans drivers
Karting World Championship drivers
People educated at Uppingham School
People from Newark and Sherwood (district)
Sportspeople from Nottinghamshire
People from Saint Barthélemy
James
Manor Motorsport drivers
OAK Racing drivers
Super Nova Racing drivers